Narduroides is a genus of Mediterranean plants in the grass family. The only known species is Narduroides salzmannii, native to Spain, France, Morocco, Algeria, Libya, Cyprus, and Turkey.

References

External links 
 Grassbase - The World Online Grass Flora

Pooideae
Monotypic Poaceae genera